Albert Batzill (born 14 December 1952) is a German sailor. He competed in the Flying Dutchman class at the 1988 Summer Olympics and the 1992 Summer Olympics. Batzill is also a four-time world champion in this class.

References

External links 
 
 
 
 

1952 births
Living people
People from Friedrichshafen
Sportspeople from Tübingen (region)
German male sailors (sport)
Soling class sailors
Sailors at the 1988 Summer Olympics – Flying Dutchman
Sailors at the 1992 Summer Olympics – Flying Dutchman
Olympic sailors of West Germany
Olympic sailors of Germany
Flying Dutchman class world champions
World champions in sailing for Germany